Pojoaque Valley High School is a public high school in unincorporated Santa Fe County, New Mexico. It is located on the Jacona Campus, which is outside of the Jacona census-designated place. It serves the Pojoaque Valley in New Mexico. Its colors are kelly green and white. Their mascot is the Elk.

Service area
It serves Cundiyo, Cuyamungue, Cuyamungue Grant, El Rancho, Jacona, Jaconita, Nambe, Pojoaque, San Ildefonso Pueblo, Tesuque Pueblo, most of El Valle de Arroyo Seco, most of Peak Place, a portion of La Tierra, and a portion of Tano Road.

Athletics 
Pojoaque Valley High School is a NMAA District 2-AAAA school along with Espanola Valley High School, Los Alamos High School, Moriarty High School and Taos High School.

PVHS competes in 12 NMAA sport and activity events. PVHS has won 21 state championships in 3A.

Notable alumni
 Javier Gonzales , 42nd mayor of Santa Fe
Ben Lujan, speaker of the New Mexico House of Representatives from 2001 to 2012
 Ben Ray Luján, U.S. senator, former congressman from New Mexico's 3rd congressional district; former member of the New Mexico Public Regulation Commission
Brenda McKenna, member of the New Mexico Senate
 Carl Trujillo, member of the New Mexico House of Representatives
 Jim Trujillo, member of the New Mexico House of Representatives

References

Public high schools in New Mexico
Schools in Santa Fe County, New Mexico